This article contains information about the literary events and publications of 1744.

Events
February 6 – Samuel Foote makes his debut as an actor as Othello at the Haymarket Theatre, London, England.
February 15 – Spranger Barry makes his debut as an actor at the Theatre Royal, Dublin.
April – The Female Spectator (a monthly) is founded by Eliza Haywood in England, the first periodical written for women by a woman.
April 14 – The Physico-Historical Society is formed in Dublin for the preservation of 'manuscripts, rare printed books, and natural curiosities relating to Ireland'.
May 29 – Alexander Pope is received into the Catholic Church, a day before his death.

New books

Fiction
Mary Collyer – Felicia to Charlotte
Sarah Fielding – The Adventures of David Simple
Eliza Haywood – The Fortunate Foundlings
Edward Moore – Fables for the Female Sex
William Oldys – The Harleian Miscellany (introduction by Samuel Johnson)
Joseph Warton – The Enthusiast

Children
John Newbery – A Little Pretty Pocket-Book
Tommy Thumb's Pretty Song Book (earliest extant English nursery-rhyme collection)

Drama
Robert Dodsley – A Select Collection of Old Plays
William Havard – Regulus
James Miller
Joseph and his Brethren (music by Handel)
Mahomet the Imposter (adapted from Voltaire's Mahomet; completed by John Hoadly)
James Ralph – The Astrologer (adapted from Thomas Tomkis's Albumazar, itself adapted from Giambattista della Porta's L'astrologo)
Antonio de Zamora – No hay deuda que no se pague y convidado de piedra

Poetry

Mark Akenside
The Pleasures of the Imagination
An Epistle to Curio
Jane Brereton – Poems
Gabriel Álvarez de Toledo (ed. Diego de Torres Villarroel) – Obras póstumas poéticas, con la Burromaquia

Non-fiction
John Armstrong – The Art of Preserving Health
George Berkeley – Siris
Pierre François Xavier de Charlevoix – Histoire et Description Generale de la Nouvelle France (History and General Description of New France)
Émilie de Breteuil, marquise du Chatelet -Dissertation sur la nature et la propagation du feu
Colley Cibber – Another Occasional Letter from Mr. Cibber to Mr. Pope
David Garrick – An Essay on Acting (attrib.)
Samuel Johnson
Life of Mr Richard Savage
An Account of the Life of John Philip Barretier
Francis Moore – A Voyage to Georgia
Alexander Pope – Essay on Man, volume 4: "Epistle: Of the Nature and State of Man, with Respect to" (4) "Happiness" (the first 2 epistles were written in 1732 and the third in 1733).
John Ranby – The Method of Treating Gunshot Wounds
Emanuel Swedenborg – The Animal Kingdom (Soul's Domain) (1744–45)
Jonathan Swift – Three Sermons

Births
January 29 – Catharina Charlotta Swedenmarck, Swedish writer (died 1813)
February 10 – William Mitford, English historian (died 1827)
April 11 (baptised) – Elizabeth Bonhôte, English novelist, essayist and poet (died 1818)
August 25 – Johann Gottfried Herder, German poet (died 1803)
December – Elsa Fougt, Swedish editor and publisher (died 1826)

Deaths
January 28 – Thomas Innes, Scottish historian (born 1662)
January 23 – Thomas Griffith, Irish actor and theatre manager (born 1680)
March 31 – Antiochus Kantemir, Russian diplomat and writer (born 1708)
April 27 – James Miller, English playwright, poet and satirist (born 1704)
May 30 – Alexander Pope, English poet and satirist (born 1688)
September 18 – Lewis Theobald, English literary historian (born 1688)

References

 
Years of the 18th century in literature